A cuckold is the husband of an adulterous wife; the wife of an adulterous husband is a cuckquean. In biology, a cuckold is a male who unwittingly invests parental effort in juveniles who are not genetically his offspring. A husband who is aware of and tolerates his wife's infidelity is sometimes called a wittol or wittold.

History of the term 

The word cuckold derives from the cuckoo bird, alluding to its habit of laying its eggs in other birds' nests. The association is common in medieval folklore, literature, and iconography.

English usage first appears about 1250 in the medieval debate poem The Owl and the Nightingale. It was characterized as an overtly blunt term in John Lydgate's The Fall of Princes, .  Shakespeare's writing often referred to cuckolds, with several of his characters suspecting they had become one.

The word often implies that the husband is deceived; that he is unaware of his wife's unfaithfulness and may not know until the arrival or growth of a child plainly not his (as with cuckoo birds).

The female equivalent cuckquean first appears in English literature in 1562, adding a female suffix to the cuck.

A related word, first appearing in 1520, is wittol, which substitutes wit (in the sense of knowing) for the first part of the word, referring to a man aware of and reconciled to his wife's infidelity.

Cuck

An abbreviation of cuckold, the term cuck has been used by the alt-right to attack the masculinity of an opponent. It was originally aimed at other conservatives.

Metaphor and symbolism 

In Western traditions, cuckolds have sometimes been described as "wearing the horns of a cuckold" or just "wearing the horns". This is an allusion to the mating habits of stags, who forfeit their mates when they are defeated by another male.

In Italy (especially in Southern Italy, where it is a major personal offence), the insult "" is often accompanied by the sign of the horns. In French, the term is "". In German, the term is "", or "", the husband is "".

In Brazil and Portugal, the term used is "", meaning exactly "horned".

Rabelais's Tiers Livers of Gargantua and Pantagruel (1546) portrays a horned fool as a cuckold. In Molière's  (1662), a man named Arnolphe (see below) who mocks cuckolds with the image of the horned buck becomes one at the end.

In Chinese usage, the cuckold (or wittol) is said to be "" , translated into English as 'wearing the green hat'. The term is an allusion to the sumptuary laws used from the 13th to the 18th centuries that required males in households with prostitutes to wrap their heads in a green scarf (or later a hat).

Associations

A saint Arnoul(t), Arnolphe, or Ernoul, possibly Arnold of Soissons, is often cited as the patron saint of cuckolded husbands, hence the name of Molière's character Arnolphe.

The Greek hero Actaeon is often associated with cuckoldry, as when he is turned into a stag, he becomes "horned". This is alluded to in Shakespeare's The Merry Wives of Windsor, Robert Burton's The Anatomy of Melancholy, and others.

Cross-cultural parallels 

In Islamic cultures, the related term  can be used to describe a person who is viewed as apathetic or permissive with regards to unchaste behaviour by female relatives or a spouse, or who lacks the demeanor of paternalistic protectiveness. The term has been criticised for its use as a pejorative while also suggestive of acceptance of vain paternalistic gender roles, stigmatization of sexuality or overprotective intrusive sexual gatekeeping.

Cuckoldry as a fetish 

Unlike the traditional definition of the term, in fetish usage a cuckold (also known as "cuckolding fetish") is complicit in their partner's sexual "infidelity"; the wife who enjoys "cuckolding" her husband is called a "cuckoldress" if the man is more submissive. The dominant man engaging with the cuckold's partner is called a "bull".

If a couple can keep the fantasy in the bedroom, or come to an agreement where being cuckolded in reality does not damage the relationship, they may try it out in reality. This, like other sexual acts, can improve the sexual relationship between partners. However, the primary proponent of the fantasy is almost always the one being humiliated, or the "cuckold": the cuckold convinces his lover to participate in the fantasy for them, though other "cuckolds" may prefer their lover to initiate the situation instead. The fetish fantasy does not work at all if the cuckold is being humiliated against their will.

Psychology regards cuckold fetishism as a variant of masochism, with the cuckold deriving pleasure from being humiliated. In his book Masochism and the Self, psychologist Roy Baumeister advanced a Self Theory analysis that cuckolding (or specifically, all masochism) was a form of escaping from self-awareness, at times when self-awareness becomes burdensome, such as with perceived inadequacy. According to this theory, the physical or mental pain from masochism brings attention away from the self, which would be desirable in times of "guilt, anxiety, or insecurity", or at other times when self-awareness is unpleasant.

See also 

 Beta male
 Candaulism
 Crime of passion
 Cuckoldry in fish
 Cuckquean
 Erotic humiliation
 Female dominance
 Female promiscuity
 Feminization (activity)
 Human sperm competition
 Monogamish
 Non-paternity event
 Open marriage
 Paternity fraud
 Polyamory
 Polyandry, marriage to multiple husbands
 Pregnancy fetishism
 Swinging
 Voyeurism

References

External links 
 
 
 

Marriage
Sexual fidelity
Sexual fetishism
BDSM terminology